The Spirit of Gold Marching Band is the collegiate marching band organized by Vanderbilt University.

Membership
A unique feature of the Spirit of Gold is that membership in the marching band is open to all students enrolled at Vanderbilt as well as students from other colleges in the Nashville area. This includes Belmont, Lipscomb, Fisk, Trevecca, Vol State and Nashville State. This does not apply to Tennessee State University as they already have their own marching band, the Aristocrat of Bands.

Performances

Football
The band forms the core of the student section at intercollegiate football games hosted by Vanderbilt at Vanderbilt Stadium and  performs at all Vanderbilt Commodores home football games, as well as a select number of away games.

The Spirit of Gold works with the Office of the Dean of Students to coordinate the band's performances at football games.  The band has developed many traditions that help add to the exciting atmosphere of Southeastern Conference football on game day. For example, the band leads a parade through campus before games and provides music for pre-game and in-game spirit.  The band plays the university's fight song, "Dynamite", throughout the game as well.

The Spirit of Gold prepares a unique halftime show for every home game, performing from variety of musical genres and eras.  Recent performances have featured music from Elton John, Fall Out Boy, Lil Nas X, Rihanna, and Beyoncé. The last halftime performance of the year is traditionally a completely student-run, student-organized show.

Basketball, Anchor of Sound
During the spring semester, a 50-piece pep band is formed for performances at Vanderbilt's men's and women's basketball games played in Memorial Gym.  Anchor of Sound performs music similar to that which Spirit of Gold performs.

Tau Beta Sigma
The Eta Phi chapter of Tau Beta Sigma serves the Spirit of Gold.  The co-ed chapter has a history of being one of the largest chapters in the nation and is the most recent recipient of the Grace and A. Frank Martin Chapter Leadership Award, a biennial award that honors the outstanding chapter in the nation.  All members of the Spirit of Gold, regardless of university, are able to seek membership in Eta Phi.

External links
 The Spirit of Gold's Website
 Renditions of songs played by the band

Notes

Vanderbilt University
Southeastern Conference marching bands
Musical groups from Tennessee
Musical groups established in 1909
1909 establishments in Tennessee